Kavir, or ambiguously Biyabanaki, is a group of Western Iranian languages spoken in the Kavir valley in central Iran. 

The Kavir languages are Farvi (~500 speakers), Garma'i (10 speakers), Khuri, and Iraji (6 speakers).

Farvi 
Farvi is a language spoken in the village of Kaviz. Despite being classified as Northwestern Iranian, it shares certain similarities with Southwestern languages. Further, it shares some sound changes with Balochi and Kurdish which distinguish them from other Northwestern languages.

References

Western Iranian languages